The Garabogazköl (also spelt Kara-Bogaz-Gol; "Black Strait Lake"), or Garabogazköl Aylagy ("Black Strait Lake Bay"), is a shallow, highly-saline water-filled depression in the northwestern corner of Turkmenistan. The Caspian Sea proper sits immediately to the west, mostly divorced by a narrow, rocky ridge having a very narrow opening through which the Caspian waters flow, overwhelmingly, into it. There is likely to be a subterranean highly saline flow, only when there is less evaporation in winter, as in the case of the Turkish Straits year-round. The lagoon's volume fluctuates seasonally, accentuated by its salt evaporation ponds and natural counterpart surrounding, seasonally dry salt pans.

It has a population of about 10,000 people.

Etymology
The gulf lends its name to the nearby city of Garabogaz. Atanyyazow explains that the name originally applied to the narrow strait which connects the gulf to the Caspian Sea. Because water in the strait, termed a "throat", was darker than the water on either side, it was termed "dark" or "black", hence garabogaz. Over time the name was applied to the gulf itself and ultimately to the city.

Salinity
The salinity of the lagoon averages about 35%, compared to the Caspian Sea's 1.2%, and 3–4% for the bulk of the world's oceans. Because of the exceptionally high salinity, comparable to the Dead Sea, it has practically no marine vegetation. Large evaporite, mostly salt deposits accumulated at the south shore, were harvested by the local population since the 1920s, but in the 1930s manual collection stopped and the industry shifted northwest to its present center near Garabogaz. From the 1950s on, ground water was pumped from levels lower than the bay itself, yielding more valuable types of salts. In 1963 construction began at Garabogaz on a modern plant for increased production of salines all the year round and independently of natural evaporation. This plant was completed in 1973.

In March 1980, workers blocked the Caspian link, due to concerns evaporation was accelerating a fall in Caspian Sea. The resulting "salt bowl" caused widespread problems of blowing salt, reportedly poisoning the soil and causing health problems for hundreds of kilometers downwind to the east.

Complete evaporation
From 1984 the lake was completely dry. In June 1992, when Caspian Sea levels rose again, the barrier was breached, allowing Caspian water to again refill Garabogazköl.

The remnants of the dam can be seen in the satellite photo of the inlet, near the Caspian Sea entrance.

In popular culture
It is the subject of Russian writer Konstantin Paustovsky's 1932 book Kara-Bugaz. In this he praises the setting up of the local salt industry by the Soviet government in the 1930s.

In 1935 the film director Aleksandr Razumny made a film Kara-bugaz (Кара-Бугаз) based on the above book, with music by Mikhail Ippolitov-Ivanov. French communist journalist Henri Barbusse was given a sneak preview of the almost-finished film, which he praised in an article in Izvestia. The film should have been shown first to Stalin, who became unhappy when he learned of its existence. Thus it was never generally released in the Soviet Union.  It had its first public screening in London in June 2010.

References

External links

 Google Maps detail showing the current in the strait

Bodies of water of Turkmenistan
Caspian Sea
Lagoons of Asia
Balkan Region
Bays of the Caspian Sea